KVCR-DT (channel 24) is a PBS member television station in San Bernardino, California, United States. It is owned by the San Bernardino Community College District alongside NPR member KVCR (91.9 FM). The two stations share studios at the San Bernardino Valley College campus on North Mt. Vernon Avenue in San Bernardino; KVCR-DT's transmitter is located atop Box Springs Mountain.

In addition to its main programming, KVCR also programs an alternate feed specifically for the Coachella Valley area known as KVCR PBS Desert Cities. This alternate feed is seen over-the-air in the Palm Springs area on low-power stations K09XW-D (channel 9) and KJHP-LD (channel 22), and is carried on KVCR's third digital subchannel.

History
KVCR-TV first signed on the air on September 11, 1962; it became the first successful UHF television station in the Inland Empire area. The station was also the first non-commercial public television station in Southern California—predating the launches of KCET (channel 28) by two years; KPBS in San Diego by five years; KOCE-TV (channel 50) in Huntington Beach by 10 years; and KLCS (channel 58) by 11 years—and the third in the entire state—preceded only by KQED in San Francisco and KVIE in Sacramento.

The station's transmitter was originally located on the campus of San Bernardino Valley College, where the channel 24 studios are still located. In the 1980s, KVCR's transmitter facilities were moved to Box Springs Mountain, overlooking Moreno Valley. The higher location along with increased effective radiated power greatly increased the station's grade A and grade B signal coverage. During the summers of 2005 and 2006, separate transmitter failures knocked both the KVCR television and radio stations off the air for extended periods.

Rebrand
In October 2017, Keith Birkfeld was named Interim General Manager at KVCR. KVCR has recently completed a rebrand of the station, becoming the "Empire Network PBS", in an effort to re-imagine KVCR in the digital age. It later rebranded simply as KVCR PBS.

Technical information

Subchannels
The station's digital signal is multiplexed:

Translators

Analog-to-digital conversion
KVCR-TV shut down its analog signal, over UHF channel 24, on June 12, 2009, as part of the federally mandated transition from analog to digital television. The station's digital signal remained on its pre-transition UHF channel 26, using PSIP to display KVCR-TV's virtual channel as 24 on digital television receivers. In 2019, UHF channel 26 was shut down and the digital signal was relocated once again to VHF channel 5.

References

External links
KVCR Rebrand to Empire Network
Official Empire Network website
R-VCR: all about KVCR in earlier years

PBS member stations
VCR-DT
VCR-DT
Television channels and stations established in 1962
Mass media in Riverside County, California
Mass media in San Bernardino, California
San Bernardino Community College District
First Nations Experience affiliates